Carmen De La Rosa (born December 25, 1985) is an American politician from the state of New York. A Democrat, De La Rosa has represented District 10 on the New York City Council since January 2022. She previously represented the 72nd District in the New York State Assembly from 2017 to 2021.

Early life, education, and family
De La Rosa was born in the Dominican Republic but came to New York City with her family at a very young age, where they settled in northern Manhattan.  She attended Mother Cabrini High School, before receiving her bachelor's degree at Fordham University in the Bronx. As of January 2022, she had one daughter with her partner, Jose.

Career
Long interested in politics, De La Rosa was active in the Democratic Party and worked for the New York State Assembly, and later became Chief of Staff to New York City Councilmember Ydanis Rodriguez in 2014. In September 2015, she ran and was elected as a Democratic District Leader for the 72nd Assembly District.

New York State Assembly (2017-2021)
In 2016, a whirlwind of open seats in Northern Manhattan Congressional, state Senate and state Assembly districts was spurred by the retirement of long-time Congressman Charlie Rangel. With Rangel's seat open, state Senator Adriano Espaillat, one of the nation's first Dominican-born elected officials, was seen as a front runner, spurring widespread excitement and support in the Dominican community for his candidacy.  Along with his own campaign, Espaillat, following his victory in the Democratic primary over six other candidates, announced his support for Marisol Alcantara to replace him in the Senate, and for De La Rosa in the 72nd Assembly district.

De La Rosa's candidacy was significant because the 72nd District was not an open seat. Long-time politician Guillermo Linares was running for re-election, despite earlier running in the congressional primary against Espaillat and others to replace Rangel.  However, since in New York federal and state primaries are not held on the same day, candidates who fail to win their federal primaries can then run in the state primaries, as Linares chose to do. However, due to a long-standing feud with Espaillat, Linares was challenged by the Congressman-elect's new political machine.

On primary day, De La Rosa would easily defeat Linares 53% to 38%, with a third candidate, Democrat George Fernandez, taking 10%. She was unopposed in the general election and was sworn in on January 1, 2017.

De La Rosa was the sponsor of the New York Dream Act, which became law in 2019.

New York City Council (2022-present)
On November 2, 2021, De La Rosa was elected to represent District 10 on the New York City Council. As of January 24, 2022, she had taken her seat on the City Council in January 2022.

References

External links
New York State Assemblywoman Carmen De La Rosa official site

1985 births
21st-century American politicians
21st-century American women politicians
American politicians of Dominican Republic descent
Dominican Republic emigrants to the United States
Fordham University alumni
Hispanic and Latino American state legislators in New York (state)
Hispanic and Latino American women in politics
Living people
Democratic Party members of the New York State Assembly
Politicians from Manhattan
Women New York City Council members
New York City Council members
Women state legislators in New York (state)